The Fiji national rugby union team has played in all Rugby World Cup tournaments, except in 1995, when they did not qualify. Their best performances were in the inaugural 1987 tournament and in the 2007 tournament, when they made it to the quarter finals.

By position

By match

1987 Rugby World Cup

Pool 3 games –

Quarter final

1991 Rugby World Cup

Pool 4 games –

1999 Rugby World Cup

Pool 3 games –

Quarter-final play-offs –

2003 Rugby World Cup

Group B games –

2007 Rugby World Cup
Fiji were placed in Pool B of the 2007 Rugby World Cup along with Wales, Canada, Japan and Australia.  After beating Japan and Canada in close matches, Fiji rested several key players against Australia for the crucial game against Wales. Australia defeated Fiji 55–12. Fiji's fate in the tournament came down to a "winner advances" game against Wales which Fiji won 38–34 and qualified for the quarter-finals for the second time.  Former Wallaby great Michael Lynagh described the see-sawing match as one of the best matches "of all time". Fiji lost their quarter final match against South Africa, however their above expectations performance in the tournament resulted in them moving up to 9th in the world rankings – their highest ever position.

Pool B games –

Quarter finals match-

2011 Rugby World Cup

2015 Rugby World Cup

2019 Rugby World Cup

Hosting
So far Fiji has not hosted any World Cup games, and has not put in bids for future tournaments. Due to the lack of facilities, and the small size of the island nation, but hopefully it will host it in the near future.

References
 Davies, Gerald (2004) The History of the Rugby World Cup (Sanctuary Publishing Ltd,
 Farr-Jones, Nick, (2003). Story of the Rugby World Cup, Australian Post Corporation,

Fiji national rugby union team
Rugby World Cup by nation